Woodbine is a suburb of Sydney, in the state of New South Wales, Australia. It is 55 kilometres south-west of the Sydney central business district, in the local government area of the City of Campbelltown and is part of the Macarthur region. Woodbine shares the postcode of 2560 with Campbelltown.

History
Officially the name Woodbine comes from a local cottage which was home to a prominent local family, the Paytens, from the 1870s to the 1960s. James Payten's cottage sat upon the hill now known as Payten Reserve. His daughter Rose Payten, was a NSW Tennis Champion and Campbelltown's first sports star. From 1901 to 1904 and again in 1907 she held the NSW Triple Crown, Singles, Doubles and Mixed Doubles Champion. The road that connects Woodbine and Leumeah, Rose Payten Drive is named after her. It has also been suggested that, during a Council argument about the name of the suburb, a disgruntled councillor suggested it be named after the cigarettes of his chain-smoking colleagues, and it was from this off-the-cuff remark that serious consideration was given to the name Woodbine. Originally the suburb was going to be named Kiddlea in honour of John Kidd, a local MP from 1877 to 1904. Many councillors did not like the idea and with the Woodbine Cottage reference brought up in council, the name was changed to Woodbine.

For over 30,000 years, the area that is now Woodbine belonged to the Tharawal people. The surrounding land still contains reminders of their past lives in rock engravings, cave paintings, axe grinding grooves and shell middens. A local park Kanbyugal Reserve is named after a Tharawal leader who met with explorer George Caley in the area in the early 19th century.

British settlers began moving into the area in the early 19th century, establishing farms and orchards in the area. Rose Payten died in 1951 and her aging Woodbine cottage was demolished in the 1960s. The expansion of Sydney saw development of the local area in the 1970s.

Australia's First Underground Display Home was built in Ettalong Place by Jewan Constructions in 1981.

Demographics
In the 2016 Australian Bureau of Statistics Census, Woodbine had a population of 2,741 people. 62.6% of residents were Australian born but there were a substantial number of languages other than English spoken including Arabic (8.4%), Hindi (2.9%), Spanish (2%), Samoan (1.5%) and Urdu (1.5%). The majority of families were couples with children (49.7%), and the median age for the suburb is 36, with the largest portion age group being infants/toddlers at 7.8%. Virtually all the homes in the area were separate houses (95.3%) with the majority (75%) owned outright or under mortgage. Approximately 55% of the suburb followed a Christian religion. Woodbine matches the national average income per household. Within the suburb itself, there were no Housing Commission properties. Unemployment in the area (6.6%) was lower than the national average with clerical, sales and service workers the most common occupation.

References

Suburbs of Sydney
City of Campbelltown (New South Wales)